Ukraine does not recognize same-sex marriage or civil unions. The Constitution of Ukraine defines marriage as between "a woman and a man". In August 2022, President Volodymyr Zelenskyy said his government was working on passing a civil partnership law that would provide same-sex couples with some of the rights and benefits of marriage.

History

Background

Article 51 of the Constitution of Ukraine, adopted by the Verkhovna Rada in 1996, states: "Marriage is based on the free consent of a woman and a man. Each of the spouses has equal rights and duties in the marriage and family." In June 2018, the Ministry of Justice said that "there is no legal grounds" for same-sex marriage in Ukraine. The wording of Article 51 is interpreted as banning same-sex marriage; however, Olha Sovgirya, a justice of the Constitutional Court of Ukraine, believes that the Constitution does not prohibit same-sex marriage, arguing that the "emphasis in Article 51 is on the freedom of marrying a member of the opposite sex, and not on the fact that the parties should be of different sexes."

On 23 November 2015, the Government of Ukraine approved an action plan to implement a "National Strategy on Human Rights" in the period up to 2020, which include the promise of drafting a bill creating civil partnerships for opposite-sex and same-sex couples by 2017. However, in early 2018, the Ministry of Justice, led by Pavlo Petrenko, stated that "the development and submission to the government of a draft law on the legalization of a registered civil partnership in Ukraine cannot be implemented" due to "numerous appeals from the regional councils, the Council of Churches and other religious organizations".

2022 petition calling for equal rights
On 3 June 2022, an online petition was launched on the official website of the President of Ukraine calling for the legalization of same-sex marriage. Citing the Russian invasion of Ukraine, the text of the petition stated: "At this time, every day may be the last. Let people of the same sex have the opportunity to start a family and have an official document confirming this. They need the same rights as traditional couples." Oksana Solonska, the media communications manager of Kyiv Pride, said, "It is important that LGBTQ people have the right to see their partner and take their body from the morgue, and seek compensation if needed. All married couples have these rights. We really hope that same-sex marriage will be legalised, so people will be able to take care of each other." The petition quickly gained signatures, and by 13 July, the petition had gathered more than 28,000 signatures. Any petitions that gather more than 25,000 signatures automatically trigger the president's consideration.

On 2 August 2022, President Volodymyr Zelenskyy issued an official response to the petition. Zelenskyy said it would be impossible to legalize same-sex marriage without an amendment to the Constitution of Ukraine, and that "[t]he Constitution of Ukraine cannot be changed during martial law or a state of emergency". "The Family Code of Ukraine defines that the family is the primary and main unit of society. A family consists of persons who live together, are connected by common life, have mutual rights and obligations. According to the Constitution of Ukraine, marriage is based on the free consent of a woman and a man (Article 51).", Zelenskyy wrote. However, Zelenskyy said that his government would work on a bill to legalize civil partnerships in Ukraine. "In the modern world, the level of democratic society is measured, among other things, through state policy aimed at ensuring equal rights for all citizens. Every citizen is an inseparable part of civil society, he is entitled to all the rights and freedoms enshrined in the Constitution of Ukraine. All people are free and equal in their dignity and rights." He called on Prime Minister Denys Shmyhal to address the issue. Shmyhal instructed the Ministry of Justice, the Ministry of Foreign Affairs and the Ministry of Social Policy to consider the issues raised in the petition.

Same-sex couples do not have a right to inheritance, hospital visitations or to make medical decisions for an ill partner. "If [my] (partner) dies ... [I] won't be allowed even to bury [him] ... they might not let [me] into the hospital", said a cadet specialising in aerial reconnaissance who had joined the Armed Forces of Ukraine in the wake of the Russian invasion. LGBT groups described Zelenskyy's statement as "historic", and called on a bill to be passed as soon as possible: "People need this now", said Olena Shevchenko. The introduction of civil partnerships would allow same-sex couples to enjoy some of the rights and benefits of marriage, including property rights, maintenance, inheritance, spousal privilege, etc. MP Inna Sovsun said she was considering introducing her own civil union bill to Parliament should the government fail to do so. Sovsun introduced a civil partnership bill in March 2023.

The Russo-Ukrainian War has spurred efforts within the military to legalize same-sex marriage, because the partners of gay soldiers are not afforded the same rights and privileges as opposite-sex partners, "although they are fighting just as bravely as their fellow straight combat troops". A soldier in Donbas said, "When we defend the country, we dismantle Russian propaganda about all gay people being communists, Marxists, and anti-Ukraine. We have destroyed these homophobic myths by fighting the Russians and risking our lives for Ukraine."

Public opinion
Russia's invasion of Ukraine in 2022 has bolstered support for the recognition of same-sex unions in Ukraine. Surveys by Nash Svit for the Kyiv International Institute of Sociology showed that opposition to same-sex civil unions had decreased from 69% in 2016 to 42% in 2022. Jul Sirous, a coordinator for volunteers and teamwork at Kyiv Pride, said, "[People are] now looking at some things in a completely different light because compared to the fact that a person might be gone tomorrow, the fact that they are gay or a lesbian – we're not paying attention to that."

A 2022 poll conducted by the Center for Social Expertise of the Institute of Sociology at the National Academy of Sciences of Ukraine showed that 27% of Ukrainians supported same-sex marriage and 26% supported it with "some exceptions", meaning that 53% supported the recognition of same-sex unions in some form. This represented a large increase from 2016 when 33% of the population supported recognising same-sex unions.

See also
LGBT rights in Ukraine
Recognition of same-sex unions in Europe

Notes

References

LGBT rights in Ukraine
Ukraine